Nguyễn Sỹ Nam (born 7 March 1993) is a Vietnamese footballer who plays as a defender for V.League 1 club Hồng Lĩnh Hà Tĩnh.

References 

1993 births
Living people
Vietnamese footballers
Association football defenders
V.League 1 players
Can Tho FC players
Song Lam Nghe An FC players